Jesús Chucho Sanoja (September 23, 1926 – December 11, 1998), was a Venezuelan musician, pianist, composer, music director and arranger.
Sanoja was survived by his grandson, Jesús Alfonso Sanoja Soulés, an audiovisual producer.

In 1958, Sanoja and his orchestra released the album, Lamento Náufrago (Shipwreck's Complain) on the record label Discomoda.

See also 
Venezuelan music

References

1926 births
1998 deaths
People from Caracas
Male composers
Male pianists
Venezuelan bandleaders
Venezuelan composers
Venezuelan pianists
20th-century pianists
20th-century composers
20th-century male musicians